{{DISPLAYTITLE:Pi2 Columbae}}

π2 Columbae, Latinized as Pi2 Columbae,  is a binary star system in the southern constellation of Columba, near the southern constellation border with Pictor. It is white-hued and dimly visible to the naked eye with a combined apparent visual magnitude of 5.50. They are receding with a heliocentric radial velocity of +31 km/s.

The pair have an angular separation of 0.1 arc seconds with the primary being an A-type main-sequence star of spectral class A0 V, while the secondary component is a similar A-type star. The primary is 98 million years old with 2.6 times the mass of the Sun and is spinning rapidly with a projected rotational velocity of 274 km/s.

References

A-type main-sequence stars
Binary stars
Columbae, Pi2
Columba (constellation)
Durchmusterung objects
042303
029064
2181